The Angelus is the official English language magazine for the Society of Saint Pius X. It is a bi-monthly magazine published by the Society of St. Pius X in the United States. It was founded by Fr. Carl Pulvermacher in 1978 in Dickinson, Texas. The offices and printing facilities were moved to Kansas City, Missouri in 1990. It is currently published by Fr. Arnaud Rostand.

The magazine contains articles relating to Church history and social teaching. It also regularly has articles on current activities of the Society and its relationship with the Vatican. One popular, regular feature is the "Questions and Answers," which answers questions on Catholic doctrine and practice.

References

External links
 Online edition of The Angelus

Bimonthly magazines published in the United States
Catholic magazines published in the United States
Magazines established in 1978
Magazines published in Missouri
Magazines published in Texas
Society of Saint Pius X
Traditionalist Catholic magazines